The Peoples' Aman Committee was an alleged militant group tied to the Pakistan People's Party and based in Karachi, Pakistan. The PAC was founded by the infamous Karachi gangster Rehman Dakait in 2008 and is accused of being involved in organized crime and gang wars. After Rehman's death in 2009, leadership of the group was taken over by Uzair Baloch.

The PAC is avowedly a support group for the Pakistan Peoples Party, the  ruling party in Pakistan from 2008 until the 2013 elections.

The organization initially only served Lyari, but soon offices were set up in other Baloch populated neighbourhoods of Karachi, such as Dalmiya (Shantinagar), Malir, Gadap, Old Golimar, Mawach Goth, and even in some nearby town and villages in Sindh and Balochistan.

The PAC has a bitter rivalry with the Muttahida Qaumi Movement (MQM) in the city of Karachi.  In March 2011, the PAC agreed to disband after its parent organization the Pakistan Peoples Party was pressured by its then allies, the MQM. Despite being officially defunct, the organization continues to function de facto on the ground.

Prohibition 
 On October 11, 2011, the PAC was banned under Clause (11/B) of Anti-terrorism Act 1997.
 
The Sindh Home Ministry, after issuing its notification also directed the law enforcement agencies to monitor PAC activities.

The home ministry notification outlaws establishment of PAC offices and restricts its activities anywhere in the province.

See also
Operation Lyari

References

Organisations designated as terrorist by Pakistan
Pakistan People's Party
Street gangs
Politics of Karachi
Organisations based in Karachi
Organised crime groups in Pakistan
Crime in Karachi
Military wings of political parties